Richard Powers (born June 18, 1957) is an American novelist whose works explore the effects of modern science and technology. His novel The Echo Maker won the 2006 National Book Award for Fiction. He has also won many other awards over the course of his career, including a MacArthur Fellowship. As of 2021, Powers has published thirteen novels and has taught at the University of Illinois and Stanford University. He won the 2019 Pulitzer Prize for Fiction for The Overstory.

Life and work

Early life
One of five children, Powers was born in Evanston, Illinois. His family later moved a few miles west to Lincolnwood, where his father was a local school principal. When Powers was 11, they moved to Bangkok, Thailand, where his father had accepted a position at International School Bangkok, which Powers attended through his freshman year, ending in 1972. During that time outside the U.S., he developed skills in vocal music and proficiency in cello, guitar, saxophone, and clarinet.  He also became an avid reader, enjoying nonfiction primarily and classics such as the Iliad and the Odyssey.

The family returned to the U.S. when Powers was 16. Following graduation in 1975 from DeKalb High School in DeKalb, Illinois, he enrolled at the University of Illinois at Urbana–Champaign (UIUC) with a major in physics, which he switched to English literature during his first semester. He earned a BA in 1978 and an MA in Literature in 1980. He decided not to pursue a PhD partly because of his aversion to strict specialization, which had been one reason for his early transfer from physics to English, and partially because he had observed in graduate students and their professors a lack of pleasure in reading and writing (as portrayed in Galatea 2.2).

Professorships and awards
In 2010 and 2013, Powers was a Stein Visiting Writer at Stanford University, during which time he partly assisted in the lab of biochemist Aaron Straight.

Powers was named a MacArthur Fellow in 1989.  He received a Lannan Literary Award in 1999.

Powers was appointed the Swanlund Professor of English at UIUC in 1996, where he is currently an emeritus professor.

On August 22, 2013, Stanford University announced that Powers had been named the Phil and Penny Knight Professor of Creative Writing in the Department of English.

Novels
Powers learned computer programming at Illinois as a user of PLATO and moved to Boston to work as a programmer. One Saturday in 1980, Powers saw the 1914 photograph "Young Farmers" by August Sander at the Museum of Fine Arts, Boston and was so inspired that he quit his job two days later to write a novel about the people in the photograph. Powers spent the next two years writing the book, Three Farmers on Their Way to a Dance, which was published by William Morrow in 1985. It comprises three alternating threads: a novella featuring the three young men in the photo during World War I, a technology magazine editor who is obsessed with the photo, and the author's critical and historical musings about the mechanics of photography and the life of Henry Ford. It was a National Book Critics Circle Award finalist, and received Rosenthal Award from the American Academy and Institute of Arts and Letters. It also received a Special Citation from PEN Hemingway Awards.

Powers moved to the Netherlands, where he wrote Prisoner's Dilemma about The Walt Disney Company and nuclear warfare.

He followed with The Gold Bug Variations about genetics, music, and computer science. It was a National Book Critics Circle Award finalist.

In 1993, Powers wrote Operation Wandering Soul about an agonized young pediatrician. It was a finalist for the National Book Award.

In 1995, Powers published the Pygmalion story Galatea 2.2 about an artificial intelligence experiment gone awry. It was a National Book Critics Circle Award finalist.

In 1998, Powers wrote Gain about a 150-year-old chemical company and a woman who lives near one of its plants and succumbs to ovarian cancer. It won the James Fenimore Cooper Prize for Best Historical Fiction in 1999.

2000's Plowing the Dark tells of a Seattle research team building a groundbreaking virtual reality while an American teacher is held hostage in Beirut. It received Harold D. Vursell Memorial Award Prize from the American Academy and Institute of Arts and Letters.

Powers wrote The Time of Our Singing in 2003. It is about the musician children of an interracial couple who met at Marian Anderson's famed 1939 concert on the Lincoln Memorial steps.

Powers's ninth novel, 2006's The Echo Maker, is about a Nebraska man who suffers head trauma in a truck accident and believes his caregiver sister is an imposter. It won a National Book Award and was a Pulitzer Prize for Fiction finalist.

Powers's tenth novel, 2009's Generosity: An Enhancement, has writing professor Russell Stone encountering his former student, Thassa, an Algerian woman whose constant happiness is exploited by journalists and scientists.

In 2014, Powers wrote Orfeo about Peter Els, a retired music composition instructor and avant-garde composer who is mistaken for a bio-terrorist after being discovered with a makeshift genetics lab in his house.

The Overstory, published in April 2018, is about nine Americans whose unique life experiences with trees bring them together to address the destruction of forests. It won the 2019 Pulitzer Prize for Fiction, was shortlisted for the Booker Prize and the $75,000 2019 PEN/Jean Stein Book Award, and was runner-up for the Dayton Literary Peace Prize.

Bewilderment, published in September 2021, was shortlisted for the 2021 Booker Prize and longlisted for the National Book Award and Andrew Carnegie Medal for Excellence in Fiction. It is described as "an astrobiologist thinks of a creative way to help his rare and troubled son in Richard Powers’ deeply moving and brilliantly original novel."

Bibliography

Novels
 1985 Three Farmers on Their Way to a Dance, HarperCollins 
 1988 Prisoner's Dilemma, McGraw Hill 
 1991 The Gold Bug Variations, William Morrow 
 1993 Operation Wandering Soul, HarperCollins 
 1995 Galatea 2.2, Farrar Straus & Giroux 
 1998 Gain, Farrar Straus & Giroux 
 2000 Plowing the Dark, Farrar, Straus & Giroux 
 2003 The Time of Our Singing, Farrar, Straus & Giroux 
 2006 The Echo Maker, Farrar, Straus & Giroux 
 2009 Generosity: An Enhancement, Farrar, Straus & Giroux 
 2014 Orfeo, W. W. Norton & Company 
 2018 The Overstory, W. W. Norton & Company 
 2021 Bewilderment, W. W. Norton & Company

Short fiction

Essays

Awards and recognition

 1985 Rosenthal Award of American Academy and Institute of Arts and Letters
 1985 PEN/Hemingway Special Citation
 1989 MacArthur Fellowship
 1991 Time Book of the Year
 1993 Finalist, National Book Award
 1996 Swanlund Professorship, University of Illinois
 1998 Business Week Best Business Books of 1998
 1998 Elected Fellow, American Academy of Arts and Sciences
 1999 James Fenimore Cooper Prize, American Society of Historians
 1999 Lannan Literary Award
 2000 Vursell Award, American Academy and Institute of Arts and Letters
 2000 Elected Fellow, Center for Advanced Study, University of Illinois
 2001 Corrington Award for Literary Excellence, Centenary College
 2001 Author of the Year, Illinois Association of Teachers of English
 2003 Pushcart Prize
 2003 Dos Passos Prize For Literature, Longwood University
 2003 W. H. Smith Literary Award (Great Britain)
 2004 Ambassador Book Award
 2006 National Book Award for Fiction
 New York Times Notable Book, 2003, 2000, 1998, 1995, 1991
 Best Books of 2003: Chicago Tribune, Christian Science Monitor, St. Louis Post-Dispatch, Newsday, London Evening Standard, Time Out (London), San Jose Mercury News
 Finalist, National Book Critics Circle Award, 2003, 1995, 1991, 1985
 2006 Finalist, Pulitzer Prize for Fiction
 2010 Elected Member, American Academy of Arts and Letters
 2014 Man Booker Prize (longlist)
 2014 California Book Awards Silver Medal Fiction winner for Orfeo 
 2018 Man Booker Prize (shortlist)
 2019 Pulitzer Prize for Fiction
 2019 PEN Oakland Josephine Miles Literary Award for The Overstory
 2020 William Dean Howells Medal for The Overstory
 2021 Booker Prize (shortlist)
 2021 Longlist, National Book Award

References

External links

 
 Richard Powers, Professor of English at UIUC
 Archived official website with extensive bibliography
 
 "Surprising Powers: Richard Powers' Scientific Humanism" by Stephen Burt from Slate
 "The Last Generalist: An Interview with Richard Powers" by Jeffrey Williams from The Minnesota Review
 Richard Powers talks with Alec Michod in The Believer
 Richard Powers Course at RIT.
 
 
 Review of "The Overstory" in WA-Post. 

1957 births
Living people
20th-century American novelists
21st-century American novelists
American male novelists
Environmental fiction writers
Granta people
James Fenimore Cooper Prize winners
MacArthur Fellows
National Book Award winners
Novelists from Illinois
People from Lincolnwood, Illinois
Postmodern writers
Pulitzer Prize for Fiction winners
University of Illinois Urbana-Champaign alumni
University of Illinois Urbana-Champaign faculty
Writers from Evanston, Illinois
20th-century American male writers
21st-century American male writers
Members of the American Academy of Arts and Letters